Güven Hokna (born January 24, 1946) is a Turkish actress.

Hokna graduated from the Ankara State Conservatory in 1967. In 1990, she presented a program for children, titled Susam Sokağı (Sesam Street), and worked in theater, film, and provided jobs for 35 years at the State Theater, and participated in many of the television business task. In 2002, she presented four works at the same time is: Ferhunde Hanımlar, İkinci Bahar, Zerda, Havada Bulut, Kumsaldaki İzler, Güz Sancısı, and portrayed one of the most famous roles in the series Valley of the Wolves in 2004. From 2006 to 2010, she appeared in the series Yaprak Dökümü.

Filmography

References

External links

 

Turkish television actresses
1946 births
Actresses from Ankara
Ankara State Conservatory alumni
Living people
20th-century Turkish actresses
Turkish people of Armenian descent
Turkish film actresses
Turkish stage actresses